Materialism is a form of philosophical monism which holds  matter to be the fundamental substance in nature, and all things, including mental states and consciousness, are results of material interactions. According to philosophical materialism, mind and consciousness are by-products or epiphenomena of material processes (such as the biochemistry of the human brain and nervous system), without which they cannot exist. This concept directly contrasts with idealism, where mind and consciousness are first-order realities to which matter is dependent while material interactions are secondary.

Materialism is closely related to physicalism—the view that all that exists is ultimately physical. Philosophical physicalism has evolved from materialism with the theories of the physical sciences to incorporate more sophisticated notions of physicality than mere ordinary matter (e.g. spacetime, physical energies and forces, and dark matter). Thus, the term physicalism is preferred over materialism by some, while others use the terms as if they were synonymous.

Philosophies traditionally opposed or largely historically unreconciled to the scientific theories of materialism or physicalism include idealism, pluralism, dualism, panpsychism, and other forms of monism.

From classical antiquity, Epicureanism is an ancient philosophy of materialism as a major forerunner to modern science. Epicurus, although ostensibly a deist, affirmed both the literal existence of the Greek gods in either some type of celestial "heaven" cognate from which they ruled the Universe (if not on a literal Mount Olympus) and his philosophy promulgated atomism, while Platonism taught roughly the opposite, despite Plato's teaching of Zeus as God.

Overview

Materialism belongs to the class of monist ontology, and is thus different from ontological theories based on dualism or pluralism. For singular explanations of the phenomenal reality, materialism would be in contrast to idealism, neutral monism, and spiritualism. It can also contrast with phenomenalism, vitalism, and dual-aspect monism. Its materiality can, in some ways, be linked to the concept of determinism, as espoused by Enlightenment thinkers.

Despite the large number of philosophical schools and subtle nuances between many, all philosophies are said to fall into one of two primary categories, defined in contrast to each other: idealism and materialism. The basic proposition of these two categories pertains to the nature of reality—the primary distinction between them is the way they answer two fundamental questions: what reality consists of, and how it originated. To idealists, spirit or mind or the objects of mind (ideas) are primary, and matter secondary. To materialists, matter is primary, and mind or spirit or ideas are secondary—the product of matter acting upon matter.

The materialist view is perhaps best understood in its opposition to the doctrines of immaterial substance applied to the mind historically by René Descartes; however, by itself materialism says nothing about how material substance should be characterized. In practice, it is frequently assimilated to one variety of physicalism or another.

Modern philosophical materialists extend the definition of other scientifically observable entities such as energy, forces and the curvature of space; however, philosophers such as Mary Midgley suggest that the concept of "matter" is elusive and poorly defined.

During the 19th century, Karl Marx and Friedrich Engels extended the concept of materialism to elaborate a materialist conception of history centered on the roughly empirical world of human activity (practice, including labor) and the institutions created, reproduced or destroyed by that activity. They also developed dialectical materialism, by taking Hegelian dialectics, stripping them of their idealist aspects, and fusing them with materialism (see Modern philosophy).

Non-reductive materialism 
Materialism is often associated with reductionism, according to which the objects or phenomena individuated at one level of description, if they are genuine, must be explicable in terms of the objects or phenomena at some other level of description—typically, at a more reduced level.

Non-reductive materialism explicitly rejects this notion, however, taking the material constitution of all particulars to be consistent with the existence of real objects, properties or phenomena not explicable in the terms canonically used for the basic material constituents. Jerry Fodor argues this view, according to which empirical laws and explanations in "special sciences" like psychology or geology are invisible from the perspective of basic physics.

Early history

Before Common Era
Materialism developed, possibly independently, in several geographically separated regions of Eurasia during what Karl Jaspers termed the Axial Age ( 800–200 BC).

In ancient Indian philosophy, materialism developed around 600 BC with the works of Ajita Kesakambali, Payasi, Kanada and the proponents of the Cārvāka school of philosophy. Kanada became one of the early proponents of atomism. The Nyaya–Vaisesika school (c. 600–100 BC) developed one of the earliest forms of atomism (although their proofs of God and their positing that consciousness was not material precludes labelling them as materialists). Buddhist atomism and the Jaina school continued the atomic tradition.

Ancient Greek atomists like Leucippus, Democritus and Epicurus prefigure later materialists. The Latin poem De Rerum Natura by Lucretius (99 – c. 55 BC) reflects the mechanistic philosophy of Democritus and Epicurus. According to this view, all that exists is matter and void, and all phenomena result from different motions and conglomerations of base material particles called atoms (literally 'indivisibles'). De Rerum Natura provides mechanistic explanations for phenomena such as erosion, evaporation, wind, and sound. Famous principles like "nothing can touch body but body" first appeared in the works of Lucretius. Democritus and Epicurus, however, did not hold to a monist ontology since they held to the ontological separation of matter and space (i.e. space being "another kind" of being) indicating that the definition of materialism is wider than the given scope of this article.

Early Common Era
Wang Chong (27 – c. 100 AD) was a Chinese thinker of the early Common Era said to be a materialist. Later Indian materialist Jayaraashi Bhatta (6th century) in his work Tattvopaplavasimha ('The upsetting of all principles') refuted the Nyāya Sūtra epistemology. The materialistic Cārvāka philosophy appears to have died out some time after 1400; when Madhavacharya compiled Sarva-darśana-samgraha ('a digest of all philosophies') in the 14th century, he had no Cārvāka (or Lokāyata) text to quote from or refer to.

In early 12th-century al-Andalus, Arabian philosopher Ibn Tufail ( Abubacer) wrote discussions on materialism in his philosophical novel, Hayy ibn Yaqdhan (Philosophus Autodidactus), while vaguely foreshadowing the idea of a historical materialism.

Modern philosophy
Thomas Hobbes (1588–1679) and Pierre Gassendi (1592–1665) represented the materialist tradition in opposition to the attempts of René Descartes (1596–1650) to provide the natural sciences with dualist foundations. There followed the materialist and atheist abbé Jean Meslier (1664–1729), along with the works of the French materialists: Julien Offray de La Mettrie, German-French Baron d'Holbach (1723–1789), Denis Diderot (1713–1784), and other French Enlightenment thinkers. In England, John "Walking" Stewart (1747–1822) insisted on seeing matter as endowed with a moral dimension, which had a major impact on the philosophical poetry of William Wordsworth (1770–1850).

In late modern philosophy, German atheist anthropologist Ludwig Feuerbach would signal a new turn in materialism through his book The Essence of Christianity (1841), which presented a humanist account of religion as the outward projection of man's inward nature. Feuerbach introduced anthropological materialism, a version of materialism that views materialist anthropology as the universal science.

Feuerbach's variety of materialism would go on to heavily influence Karl Marx, who in the late 19th century elaborated the concept of historical materialism—the basis for what Marx and Friedrich Engels outlined as scientific socialism:

Through his Dialectics of Nature (1883), Engels later developed a "materialist dialectic" philosophy of nature; a worldview that would be given the title dialectical materialism by Georgi Plekhanov, the father of Russian Marxism. In early 20th-century Russian philosophy, Vladimir Lenin further developed dialectical materialism in his book Materialism and Empirio-criticism (1909), which connected the political conceptions put forth by his opponents to their anti-materialist philosophies.

A more naturalist-oriented materialist school of thought that developed in the middle of the 19th century was German materialism, which included Ludwig Büchner (1824–99), the Dutch-born Jacob Moleschott (1822–93)  and Carl Vogt (1817–95), even though they had different views on core issues such as the evolution and the origins of life in nature.

Contemporary history

Analytic philosophy

Contemporary analytic philosophers (e.g. Daniel Dennett, Willard Van Orman Quine, Donald Davidson, and Jerry Fodor) operate within a broadly physicalist or scientific materialist framework, producing rival accounts of how best to accommodate the mind, including functionalism, anomalous monism, identity theory, and so on.

Scientific materialism is often synonymous with, and has typically been described as being, a reductive materialism. In the early 21st century, Paul and Patricia Churchland advocated a radically contrasting position (at least, in regards to certain hypotheses): eliminative materialism. Eliminative materialism holds that some mental phenomena simply do not exist at all, and that talk of those mental phenomena reflects a totally spurious "folk psychology" and introspection illusion. A materialist of this variety might believe that a concept like "belief" simply has no basis in fact (e.g. the way folk science speaks of demon-caused illnesses).

With reductive materialism being at one end of a continuum (our theories will reduce to facts) and eliminative materialism on the other (certain theories will need to be eliminated in light of new facts), revisionary materialism is somewhere in the middle.

Continental philosophy

Contemporary continental philosopher Gilles Deleuze has attempted to rework and strengthen classical materialist ideas. Contemporary theorists such as Manuel DeLanda, working with this reinvigorated materialism, have come to be classified as new materialist in persuasion. New materialism has now become its own specialized subfield of knowledge, with courses being offered on the topic at major universities, as well as numerous conferences, edited collections and monographs devoted to it.

Jane Bennett's book Vibrant Matter (2010) has been particularly instrumental in bringing theories of monist ontology and vitalism back into a critical theoretical fold dominated by poststructuralist theories of language and discourse. Scholars such as Mel Y. Chen and Zakiyyah Iman Jackson, however, have critiqued this body of new materialist literature for its neglect in considering the materiality of race and gender in particular.

Métis scholar Zoe Todd, as well as Mohawk (Bear Clan, Six Nations) and Anishinaabe scholar Vanessa Watts, query the colonial orientation of the race for a "new" materialism. Watts in particular describes the tendency to regard matter as a subject of feminist or philosophical care as a tendency that is too invested in the reanimation of a Eurocentric tradition of inquiry at the expense of an Indigenous ethic of responsibility. Other scholars, such as Helene Vosters, echo their concerns and have questioned whether there is anything particularly "new" about this so-called "new materialism," as Indigenous and other animist ontologies have attested to what might be called the "vibrancy of matter" for centuries. Other scholars such as Thomas Nail have critiqued "vitalist" versions of new materialism for its depoliticizing "flat ontology" and for being ahistorical in nature.

Quentin Meillassoux proposed speculative materialism, a post-Kantian return to David Hume which is also based on materialist ideas.

Defining 'matter'
The nature and definition of matter—like other key concepts in science and philosophy—have occasioned much debate:

 If there is a single kind of matter (hyle) that everything is made of, or multiple kinds
 If matter is a continuous substance capable of expressing multiple forms (hylomorphism) or a number of discrete, unchanging constituents (atomism)?
 If it has intrinsic properties (substance theory) or lacks them (prima materia)

One challenge to the conventional concept of matter as tangible "stuff" came with the rise of field physics in the 19th century. Relativity shows that matter and energy (including the spatially distributed energy of fields) are interchangeable. This enables the ontological view that energy is prima materia and matter is one of its forms. In contrast, the Standard Model of particle physics uses quantum field theory to describe all interactions. On this view it could be said that fields are prima materia and the energy is a property of the field.

According to the dominant cosmological model, the Lambda-CDM model, less than 5% of the universe's energy density is made up of the "matter" described by the Standard Model, and the majority of the universe is composed of dark matter and dark energy, with little agreement among scientists about what these are made of.

With the advent of quantum physics, some scientists believed the concept of matter had merely changed, while others believed the conventional position could no longer be maintained. For instance Werner Heisenberg said, "The ontology of materialism rested upon the illusion that the kind of existence, the direct 'actuality' of the world around us, can be extrapolated into the atomic range. This extrapolation, however, is impossible…atoms are not things."

The concept of matter has changed in response to new scientific discoveries. Thus materialism has no definite content independent of the particular theory of matter on which it is based. According to Noam Chomsky, any property can be considered material, if one defines matter such that it has that property.

In the philosophical materialism G. Bueno redefines the term matter for philosophy and defines a more precise term than matter, the stroma

Physicalism

George Stack distinguishes between materialism and physicalism: 

However, not all conceptions of physicalism are tied to verificationist theories of meaning or direct realist accounts of perception. Rather, physicalists believe that no "element of reality" is missing from the mathematical formalism of our best description of the world. "Materialist" physicalists also believe that the formalism describes fields of insentience. In other words, the intrinsic nature of the physical is non-experiential.

Religious and spiritual views

Christianity

Hinduism and Transcendental Club

Most of Hinduism and transcendentalism regard all matter as an illusion, or maya, blinding humans from knowing the truth. Transcendental experiences like the perception of Brahman are considered to destroy the illusion.

Criticism and alternatives

From contemporary physicists
Rudolf Peierls, a physicist who played a major role in the Manhattan Project, rejected materialism: "The premise that you can describe in terms of physics the whole function of a human being... including knowledge and consciousness, is untenable. There is still something missing."

Erwin Schrödinger said, "Consciousness cannot be accounted for in physical terms. For consciousness is absolutely fundamental. It cannot be accounted for in terms of anything else."

Werner Heisenberg, who came up with the uncertainty principle, wrote, "The ontology of materialism rested upon the illusion that the kind of existence, the direct 'actuality' of the world around us, can be extrapolated into the atomic range. This extrapolation, however, is impossible... Atoms are not things."

Quantum mechanics
Some 20th-century physicists (e.g., Eugene Wigner and Henry Stapp), as well as modern day physicists and science writers (e.g., Stephen Barr, Paul Davies, and John Gribbin) have argued that materialism is flawed due to certain recent scientific findings in physics, such as quantum mechanics and chaos theory. According to Gribbin and Davies (1991):

Digital physics
The objections of Davies and Gribbin are shared by proponents of digital physics who view information rather than matter to be fundamental. Famous physicist and proponent of digital physics John Archibald Wheeler wrote, "all matter and all things physical are information-theoretic in origin and this is a participatory universe." Their objections were also shared by some founders of quantum theory, such as Max Planck, who wrote:

James Jeans concurred with Planck saying, "The Universe begins to look more like a great thought than like a great machine. Mind no longer appears to be an accidental intruder into the realm of matter."

Philosophical objections
In the Critique of Pure Reason, Immanuel Kant argued against materialism in defending his transcendental idealism (as well as offering arguments against subjective idealism and mind–body dualism). However, Kant with his refutation of idealism, argues that change and time require an enduring substrate.

Postmodern/poststructuralist thinkers also express a skepticism about any all-encompassing metaphysical scheme. Philosopher Mary Midgley argues that materialism is a self-refuting idea, at least in its eliminative materialist form.

Varieties of idealism
Arguments for idealism, such as those of Hegel and Berkeley, often take the form of an argument against materialism; indeed, the idealism of Berkeley was called immaterialism. Now, matter can be argued to be redundant, as in bundle theory, and mind-independent properties can, in turn, be reduced to subjective percepts.  Berkeley presents an example of the latter by pointing out that it is impossible to gather direct evidence of matter, as there is no direct experience of matter; all that is experienced is perception, whether internal or external.  As such, the existence of matter can only be assumed from the apparent (perceived) stability of perceptions; it finds absolutely no evidence in direct experience.

If matter and energy are seen as necessary to explain the physical world, but incapable of explaining mind, dualism results. Emergence, holism and process philosophy seek to ameliorate the perceived shortcomings of traditional (especially mechanistic) materialism without abandoning materialism entirely.

Materialism as methodology
Some critics object to materialism as part of an overly skeptical, narrow or reductivist approach to theorizing, rather than to the ontological claim that matter is the only substance. Particle physicist and Anglican theologian John Polkinghorne objects to what he calls promissory materialism—claims that materialistic science will eventually succeed in explaining phenomena it has not so far been able to explain. Polkinghorne prefers "dual-aspect monism" to materialism.

Some scientific materialists have been criticized for failing to provide clear definitions for what constitutes matter, leaving the term materialism without any definite meaning. Noam Chomsky states that since the concept of matter may be affected by new scientific discoveries, as has happened in the past, scientific materialists are being dogmatic in assuming the opposite.

See also

 Aleatory materialism
 Antimaterialism beliefs:
Gnosticism
Idealism
Immaterialism
Maya (religion)
Mind–body dualism
Platonic realism
Supernaturalism
Transcendentalism
 Cārvāka
 Christian materialism
 Critical realism
 Cultural materialism
 Dialectical materialism
 Economic materialism
 Existence
 French materialism
 Grotesque body
 Historical materialism
 Hyle
 Incorporeality
 Madhyamaka, a philosophy of Middle Way
 Marxist philosophy of nature
 Materialist feminism
 Metaphysical naturalism
 Model-dependent realism
 Naturalism (philosophy)
 Philosophical materialism
 Philosophy of mind
 Physical ontology
 Postmaterialism
 Quantum energy
 Rational egoism
 Reality in Buddhism
 Scientistic materialism
 Substance theory
 Transcendence (religion)

Notes

a.  Indeed, it has been noted it is difficult if not impossible to define one category without contrasting it with the other.

References

Further reading

 Buchner, L. (1920). Force and Matter. New York, Peter Eckler Publishing Co.
 Churchland, Paul (1981). Eliminative Materialism and the Propositional Attitudes. The Philosophy of Science. Boyd, Richard; P. Gasper; J. D. Trout. Cambridge, Massachusetts, MIT Press.
 
 
 Fodor, J.A. (1974). "Special Sciences", Synthese, Vol. 28.
 Gunasekara, Victor A. (2001). "Buddhism and the Modern World". Basic Buddhism: A Modern Introduction to the Buddha's Teaching". 18 January 2008
 Kim, J. (1994) Multiple Realization and the Metaphysics of Reduction, Philosophy and Phenomenological Research, Vol. 52. 
 La Mettrie, La Mettrie, Julien Offray de (1748). L'Homme Machine (Man a Machine)
 Lange, Friedrich A. (1925) The History of Materialism. New York, Harcourt, Brace, & Co.
 
  Alternative 
 Schopenhauer, Arthur (1969). The World as Will and Representation. New York, Dover Publications, Inc.
 Seidner, Stanley S. (10 June 2009). "A Trojan Horse: Logotherapeutic Transcendence and its Secular Implications for Theology". Mater Dei Institute 
 Vitzthum, Richard C. (1995) Materialism: An Affirmative History and Definition''. Amherst, New York, Prometheus Books.

External links

Stanford Encyclopedia:
Physicalism
Eliminative Materialism
Philosophical Materialism (by Richard C. Vitzthum) from infidels.org
Dictionary of the Philosophy of Mind on Materialism from the University of Waterloo
A new theory of ideomaterialism being a synthesis of idealism and materialism

 
Metaphysical theories
Ontology